Gibberula pacifica is a species of sea snail, a marine gastropod mollusk, in the family Cystiscidae.

References

pacifica
Gastropods described in 1868
Cystiscidae